The 2017 Mayo Intermediate Football Championship is the 53rd edition of the Mayo GAA's second-tier gaelic football tournament for intermediate clubs in County Mayo, Ireland. Sixteen teams compete with the winner representing Mayo in the Connacht Intermediate Club Football Championship. The championship starts with a group stage and progresses to a knock out stage.

Westport were the 2016 champions after defeating Kiltimagh in the final. In March 2017, they claimed the All-Ireland Club IFC title, defeating Meath champions St. Colmcille's.

Group stage
All 16 teams enter the competition at this stage. The top 2 teams in each group go into the Quarter-Finals while the bottom team of each group will enter a Relegation Playoff. This year, all teams will play one home match, one away match and one match at a neutral venue.

Group A

Round 1

Round 2

Round 3

Group B

Round 1

Round 2

Round 3

Group C

Round 1

Round 2

Round 3

Group D

Round 1

Round 2

Round 3

Quarter-finals

Semi finals

Final

Connacht Intermediate Club Football Championship

References

Mayo
Gaelic football competitions in County Mayo